"The Compleat Werewolf" is a 1942 fantasy short story by Anthony Boucher. It was first published in Unknown Worlds.

Synopsis

When philology professor Wolfe Wolf learns a magic word that can transform him into a wolf, the consequences are not what he expected.

Reception

"The Compleat Werewolf" was a finalist for the 1943 Retro-Hugo Award for Best Novella.

Kirkus Reviews called it a "giddy burlesque", while the SF Site listed it among Boucher's "best stories". Brian Stableford described it as an example of "preliminary de-historicization followed by re-accommodation to American pragmatism".

Its presence in the 2013 anthology Unnatural Creatures brought it to renewed attention, with Publishers Weekly stating that it was "astonishingly silly"; however, Tor.com felt that it was "a little out-of-step and dated", and the A.V. Club noted that "cramming Nazis, werewolves, Indian rope tricks, and talking cats into one narrative (is) quite a feat, but still takes too long" compared to more modern stories.

References

External links

Text of the story, at Archive.org

Works originally published in Unknown (magazine) 
Werewolf fiction
Works by Anthony Boucher
1942 short stories